The 1919 PCHA season was the eighth season of the professional men's ice hockey Pacific Coast Hockey Association league. Season play ran from January 1 to March 10. The season was increased to 20 games per team.

The Vancouver Millionaires club were the regular season PCHA champions, but lost the playoff to Seattle Metropolitans. The Mets then played in the 1919 Stanley Cup Finals against the National Hockey League champion Montreal Canadiens. Due to the ongoing Spanish flu pandemic, the series was not completed; a number of players had to be hospitalized, including Canadiens defenceman Joe Hall, who died four days after the cancellation.

League business
The Portland franchise was suspended for the season. Victoria's Patrick Arena was again available for ice hockey use. Victoria was re-activated and took over the contracts of the Rosebud players.

Regular season
Hap Holmes returned to the PCHA to Seattle from Toronto. Vancouver got Art Duncan back from World War I, and picked up Fred Harris from Portland. Seattle's Cully Wilson was suspended from the league for breaking Mickey MacKay's jaw in a fight, using his stick to cross-check MacKay in the face. While Cyclone Taylor won the goal-scoring title with 23 goals, the second-place Bernie Morris scored five goals against Victoria on February 14. Third-place Smokey Harris scored five goals against Victoria on March 10.

Final standings
Note: W = Wins, L = Losses, T = Ties, GF= Goals For, GA = Goals against
Teams that qualified for the playoffs are highlighted in bold

Playoffs
In a reversal of the previous year's playoffs, the second-place Metropolitans defeated the first-place Vancouver Millionaires. Vancouver was missing Mickey MacKay due to injury and coaxed Si Griffis out of retirement for the last two games of the season and the playoffs.

Frank Foyston was the star of the first game, scoring three goals for Seattle. The 6–1 win was enough to hold the series, as they dropped the return game in Vancouver, where Harris scored two in a losing cause.

Seattle Metropolitans vs. Vancouver Millionaires

Seattle wins two-game total-goals series 7 to 5

Stanley Cup Finals

The Mets then played against the NHL champions Montreal Canadiens. Due to the outbreak of flu at the time, players from both teams were hospitalized, and the series was not completed.

Montreal Canadiens vs. Seattle Metropolitans

Series ended 2–2–1 and no winner awarded – playoffs were curtailed due to the influenza epidemic

All games were actually played in Seattle, but Seattle is listed as the home team for games played under PCHA rules, and Montreal is the "home" team for games played under NHL rules.

Schedule and results

Source: Coleman

Player statistics

Goalkeepers

Source: Coleman

Scoring leaders

See also
1918–19 NHL season

References

Notes

Bibliography

 

 
Pacific Coast Hockey Association seasons
2
PCHA